Many valuable paintings have been stolen. The paintings listed are from masters of Western art which are valued in millions of U.S. dollars.

Unrecovered

Rumored to be destroyed or lost

Plundered by the Nazis

Recovered

See also

Art Recovery Group
Art theft
Commission for Looted Art in Europe
Looted art
Lost artworks
Monuments Men — Monuments, Fine Arts, and Archives program
Nazi plunder
 Gurlitt Collection, around 1500 works amassed by Hildebrand Gurlitt

References

External links

FBI: Art Theft
Art and Antiques Unit – New Scotland Yard
The Art Loss Register  The world's largest database of stolen art 
Stolen Masterpieces - Famous Stolen Oil Paintings

Stolen paintings
 
 
Stolen paintings